Rain Tree is a 2001 Iranian drama film Written and directed by Hossein Shahabi (Persian: حسین شهابی)

Starring
 Saeed Shilesari
 Ali Babakhani
 Ali Habibpoor
 Mohammad Saremi
 Reza novini
 Samir Bakht Avar
 Ahmad Kalhor
 Soheyla Sadegi

Crew
 Composer: Hossein Shahabi 
 Photography: Ahmad Pejhman
 Assistant Director: Manli Shojaeefard
 Producer: Esmat Soofi

References

1999 films
Iranian drama films
Films directed by Hossein Shahabi